Triângulo is a neighbourhood in the rural area of Telêmaco Borba, Brazil.

References

Neighbourhoods in Telêmaco Borba